Mallory Jansen (born 18 June 1988) is an Australian actress. She co-starred as Madalena in the ABC series Galavant. Following the cancellation of Galavant, she joined the cast of Marvel's Agents of S.H.I.E.L.D. as "Aida", Agnes Kitsworth, the human template of the former, and Madame Hydra.

In 2014, she played Helena Christensen in the two-part miniseries INXS: Never Tear Us Apart. She had recurring roles in the ABC Family sitcoms Baby Daddy and Young & Hungry.

Mallory trained in 2011 in New York at Stella Adler Studio of Acting.

Filmography

References

External links
 
 

1989 births
Living people
21st-century Australian actresses
Actresses from Melbourne
Australian expatriate actresses in the United States
Australian female models
Australian film actresses
Australian television actresses